The 2022 WPA World Ten-ball Championship was a professional pool tournament for the discipline of ten-ball organised by the World Pool-Billiard Association (WPA) and CueSports International. It was the seventh WPA World Ten-ball Championship. Held in Las Vegas, the event started on March 28 with the championship match on April 1. The event featured a prize fund of $226,000.

The competition began wth 128 participants, selected according to world and continental pool rankings as well as qualifying events. The tournament was played as a double-elimination bracket until 32 players remained, at which point it changed to a single-elimination format.

Defending champion Eklent Kaçi of Albania reached the semi-finals before being eliminated, as did Jayson Shaw of Scotland. In the championship match, Wojciech Szewczyk of Poland defeated Christopher Tévez of Peru, 10–8.

Knockout draw
The following results only show the single-elimination stage comprising the final 32 players. All matches at this stage were played as race-to-ten racks. Players in bold represent match winners.

Source:

References

2022
WPA World Ten-ball Championship
WPA World Ten-ball Championship
International sports competitions hosted by the United States
Cue sports in the United States
Sports competitions in Las Vegas
WPA World Ten-ball Championship
WPA World Ten-ball Championship
WPA World Ten-ball Championship